Puidoux railway station, also known as Puidoux-Chexbres railway station (until 2018), is a railway station in the municipality of Puidoux, in the Swiss canton of Vaud. It is an intermediate stop on the standard gauge Lausanne–Bern line and the western terminus of the Vevey–Chexbres line, both owned by Swiss Federal Railways.

Before Chexbres-Village railway station was opened nearby in 1904, it was known as Chexbres railway station.

Services 
 the following services stop at Pully-Nord:

 RER Vaud:

References

External links 
 
 

Railway stations in the canton of Vaud
Swiss Federal Railways stations